Malcolm Brown (born 13 December 1956) is a former professional footballer who made more than 500 appearances in the Football League in the 1970s and 1980s. He played as a right back for Bury, Huddersfield Town, where he spent the majority of his career, Newcastle United, Rochdale and Stockport County.

Brown began his career as an apprentice at Bury, before moving to Huddersfield Town in 1977, where he helped the club to two promotions during Mick Buxton's reign as manager. He eventually left for Newcastle United in 1983, but missed the whole of the 1983–84 promotion season because of injury. He returned to Huddersfield in 1985 for another four seasons, playing more than 400 games for the club in all. He finished his professional career with two spells at Rochdale either side of two seasons with Stockport County.

Honours
Individual
PFA Team of the Year: 1990–91 Fourth Division

References

External links
 
 Player Profile at toon1892.com

1956 births
Living people
Footballers from Salford
English footballers
Association football fullbacks
Bury F.C. players
Huddersfield Town A.F.C. players
Newcastle United F.C. players
Stockport County F.C. players
Rochdale A.F.C. players
English Football League players